Leonel Alfredo Reyes Saravia (born November 19, 1976) is a Bolivian former footballer who played as a midfielder.

Club career
Reyes last played for The Strongest in the Liga de Fútbol Profesional Boliviano.

He played in the finals of the Copa Sudamericana 2004, a game in which he received a yellow card.

International career
Reyes was also a member of the Bolivia national team competing at the Copa América 2007. He has earned a total of 22 caps, scoring 2 goals and represented his country in 10 FIFA World Cup qualification matches.

References

External links

1976 births
Living people
Footballers from La Paz
Association football midfielders
Bolivian footballers
Bolivia international footballers
Club Bolívar players
The Strongest players
2007 Copa América players